This is a list of notable professional and semi-professional paintball teams that have played in a professional tournament. A professional paintball team is one that plays paintball with the financial, equipment or other kind of support of one or more sponsors, often in return for advertising rights. Several professional teams have different names in different leagues due to franchising and sponsorship issues.

Professional tournament teams

North American Professional Teams
AC Diesel
Austin Notorious - Austin's first Professional team ever
Baltimore Revo
Edmonton Impact - Includes players Justin Cornell, the Yachimec brothers, and Dave Baines; the team won their first professional division PSP event in 2010 at the PSP Phoenix Open. As of 2011 sponsored by Planet Eclipse and DXS Paintball
NRG Elite- A new pro team after the recent 2020 merger with Green Bay Boom
Houston Heat - Players Include Bouchez, Slowiak, Monville, Dizon, and Woodley. It is a combination of former Chicago Aftershock, Moscow Red Legion, and Distortion players, Houston Heat (not to be confused with the original Houston Heat of the 1990s). Won first place in only their second event as a unified team at the 2012 PSP Phoenix Open. Went on to win 3 total events out of 5 in 2012, placing 2nd in a 4th event. Won the PSP World Cup and Series title in their first year as a team.
Latin Saints
Los Angeles Ironmen - DYE Precision's factory team.
Los Angeles Infamous - Owned by Travis Lemanski.  They are sponsored by Planet Eclipse, Push, HK Army, Valken and First Strike
ML Kings
Moscow Red Legion - the premiere team from Russia, they are sponsored by Dye Precision and Pro-Shar Paint. (Formerly Russian Legion)
New York Xtreme
Columbus LVL- A new pro team entering 2020 after a merger with PC Katana
San Antonio X-Factor
San Diego Dynasty - Previously sponsored by Planet Eclipse, paintball team with the most professional wins. Now sponsored by HK Army as of November 2012. Sponsored by Field One (Bob Long) as of 2017. 
San Diego Aftermath
Seattle Thunder
Seattle Uprising
Tampa Bay Damage - 2012 PSP world cup winner.

Past North American Professional Teams

Adrenaline
All Americans
All Americans 2
Anaheim Sedition (2003-2006)
Art Chaos Moscow (Left in 2014 core members of team now on Houston Heat)
St. Louis Avalanche (Last seen playing Pro in the NPPL 2013 but not heard from since)
Bad Company 
Team Edge ( competitive edge ) Team 1993-1994 (3rd)-1995(4th)-1996(3rd)-1997(np) am nationals Tom edge, Manny Sanchez, Brian Kerr, Alex Hernandez, Kevin Gray, Tony Sims, Edgar Sanz, Braileo Marojon ( team funded Hydro lines, Impact paintball, GAS inc, American Telecom ) disbanded 1997 players moved to Team Nemisis and Team Swarm 
Baltimore Trauma
Boonie Boys, Ontario Canads
Chattanooga CEP (Left in 2014)
Chicago Farside
Chicago Legend
DC Arsenal
Detroit Crush
Dominion V3 - PSP 10 man (1999-2005), NPPL 10 Man (1999-2003), NPPL Super 7 (2004-2005) split into various teams after 2005
Master Blasters 
Detroit Fusion - Later became Detroit Revolution
Detroit Revolution
Detroit Strange - Later many players formed Tampa Bay Damage
Entourage 
Genesis
Houston VcK
Indianapolis Mutiny - Left the NPPL in 2012 to compete in division 1 PSP
Jacksonville Raiders
Jacksonville Warriors (Jax Warriors) 
Las Vegas LTZ
Los Angeles Fatal Swoop
Miami Effect - Later became Infamous
Miami Rage
Miami Raiders
New England Hurricanes - Playing Semi-Pro as of 2020
New Jersey Jesters - Relegated Back to Division 1 for poor performance in 2013 PSP Challengers Division.
New York Xtreme
Oakland Blast 
Omaha VICIOUS (Left in 2014)
Orange County Bushwackers
PC Katana
Portland Naughty Dogs
Philadelphia Americans - Defunct
Phoenix United
Red Tyde
Sacramento DMG
Sacramento XSV (Left in 2014)
San Diego/Escondido Aftermath
San Diego Legacy
San Francisco Explicit 
Santa Barbara Slam - Played in the late 1980s early 1990s throughout California. David Hanson, Paul Santana, Scott Martin, and others. Now defunct.
Scottsdale Elevation - Left the NPPL to compete in Semi Pro PSP. Eventually moved to Division 2 PSP
Seattle Naughty Dogs - players later went on to form part of Seattle Thunder
Stockholm Joy Division
Swarm of Illinois
Team Havoc - Calgary AB
Texas Devils - Only in 2007 - 2008
Tippmann Effect
Trenton Top gun Union
Triple Tap-Defunct (competed in both NPPL and Millennium European League)
Ultimate
Vancouver Fracture
Vancouver Vendetta
Team Crowley (PSP 2004-2005)
Team Xtreme (Atlanta)
Upton 187 cRew- upTon 187 cRew is out of Fox4 Paintball in upTon MASS, Coached by Dave painter, owner of Fox4 Paintball. 187 cRew will be starting its professional career in the 2012 PSP circuit and is sponsored by Empire Paintball and Planet Eclipse. Currently not together anymore after the 2016 season.

European Professional Teams
 Amsterdam Heat
 Ala Warsaw
 BM United Deidenberg
 Corvos Paintball Team Algarve
 Offenburg Comin At Ya
 Consilium Dei Züri
 Copenhagen Ducks
 Dogs D'Amour
 Dornbirn Daltons
 Drammen Solid
 Elite-Paintball-Club
 Frankfurt Syndicate
 Glory Skulls Dorsten
 Helsinki Cyclone
 Hulk Kiev
 Intemperate Luxembour
 London Tigers
 London Samurai
 Lucky 15’s

 Marseille Icon
 MLKings Prague
 Odense Ugly Ducklings
 Outrage Valence 
 Paris Camp Carnage
 Ramstein Instinct
 Red Storm Moscow
 Rønholt Blast
 Russian Legion Moscow
 SK Moscow
 S.L. Benfica
 Stockholm Ignition
 Stockholm Joy Division
 Toulouse Dagnir Dae
 Toulouse TonTon's
 UK Predators
 Vienna United
 Vision Marseille

Australian Pro Teams
 Eskimo Brothers
 Eskimo Nation
 Expendables
 Marauders
 RAW
 Team 404
 The Mungers
 STK
 Sydney SWAT

Asian leagues
 Infernal Thailand
 Mission 2 Mars Thailand 
 Xtioneers Malaysia
 Raskal Malaysia
 Datis Iran
 Demonz 
 Team KU Japan
 Macdev Ronin
 STK
 Nemesis Legion Malaysia
IMPERIA
INFAMY AISAWAN
ShootinRage
 LANUN
 MacDev Outlaws
 HeartBreaKers
 We Are Legion
 Aletheia SG
 Nitamago Japan
 EJPC
 EJPC Jr
 Rampage Aisawan

Former European professional teams now defunct
 Manchester Lions
 Kellys Heroes
 UK Porn Stars 
 Bad Company
 Banzai Bandits
 Nam Wreckin Crew (NWC)
 Chilli Peppers Riga
 Budapest Bullets 
 Budapest Pornstars
 Antwerp Overdrive
 Oslo Menace
 Vision PPC Grenoble
 London Nexus
 Manchester Kellys
 Manchester Shockwave 
 K2
 Influence Montpellier
 Moscow Caste
 Moscow Phoenix
 Orebro Powertrip
 Voltage
 The Rat Pack ( Wolverhampton U.K. )
 Just Somanc

Former professional teams now defunct
 Adrenline (NPPL)
 Bad Company (NPPL)
 Baltimore Trauma (NXL) - This was the first team in history to win four NPPL events in a row, which they did during the 2004 season.  They were a team based out of the East coast and mainly a grass-roots team.  The team filled with young players bumped up in divisions as they picked up high-profile players such as Rob Staudinger and a couple of others.  The Carolina-based team went on to compete in the NXL and won the world championship in 2005.
 Boonie Rats, Dallas, TX State Champions 1990 per Paint Ball Magazine
 Bushmasters, CA (Lively, NPPL)
 Bushmasters, Fl (Lively, NPPL)
 Bushwhackers (NPPL, PSP)
 Constant Pursuit (Lively, NPPL) Last official roster contained 5 players from Canada's Boonie Boys.
 Team Edge ( Competitive Edge ) NPPL Hollywood, Miami Florida 12 players ( 2 5 man teams) 2 alts 1993-1997 
 DC Arsenal (NPPL)
 Detroit Fusion - (NPPL) Later most all players left to form Detroit Revolution
 Detroit Revolution - (NPPL)
 Detroit Strange (NPPL, NXL)
 Enemy (NPPL)
 Farside (NPPL)
 Fatal Swoop (NPPL)
 Florida Annihilators
 Florida Terminators
 Ground Zero (New York Xtreme) - Winners of the Pro Division in the first ever Skyball Paintball Tournament which was held in the Rogers Centre in Toronto, Ontario, Canada.
 Houston Heat - Reincarnation in 2012 PSP Pro
 Image (NPPL)
 Jax Raiders (PSP)
 Jax Warriors (NPPL, PSP)
 Jersey Authority (NPPL)
 Joy Division Paintball - First European team to win a NPPL cup
 Las Vegas LTZ (Xball)
 Lockout (Rochester, NY)
 London Shock
 Miami Rage
 Naughty Dogs (NPPL)
 Navarone (NPPL)
New England Express
 Lara PaintBall (Venezuela 1995-1997 Integrado por: Abraham López, Jesús Briceño, Juan Carlos Mendez, Otoniel Strubber, Francisco Valentín)
 New England Hurricanes - As of 2010, moved down at their own will with different roster to the PSP Division 1 RaceTo-5 level. Disbanded before 2012 season.
 Newport Entourage 
Oakland Assassins 
 Oakland Blast - currently in hiatus as of the 2012 season.
 Phoenix United (USPL/NPPL)
 Philly All-Americans - As of 2010 now defunct 
Revolution (Former Detroit Fusion players after the Fusion / Extreme game fixing scandal at Pittsburgh NPPL) 
 Rat Pack ( Wolverhampton U.K.)
 Scottsdale Elevation (USPL/NPPL)
 Sudden Death
 Texas Storm
 Team Crowley (PSP 2004-2005)
 Team Havoc - Calgary AB
 Tour de Force
 Triple Tap-Defunct (competed in both NPPL and Millennium European League)
 Ultimate (Xball)
 Wild Geese

See also
Paintball
LARA PAINTBALL Venezuela (1995-1997)
List of paintball leagues
Angola Paintball Team

References